Ben Kilner is a British former professional rugby league footballer who played as a  for the Wigan Warriors in the Super League.

He spent on time on from Wigan at Leigh Centurions, Dewsbury Rams and  Rochdale Hornets in the Championship.

Career
Kilner played his amateur rugby league for the Oulton Raiders. In 2015 he joined Wigan on the club's scholarship scheme and played for Wigan's victorious academy side in the 2017 and 2018 Academy Grand Finals.

In 2018 he made his first first-class appearances while on loan at Championship side, Leigh. The following season he spent time on loan at two more Championship clubs, Dewsbury and Rochdale.  At the start of the 2020 season Wigan loaned him to Toronto Wolfpack but because of the COVID-19 pandemic he did not make any appearances for the Canadian side.  His only first team appearance for Wigan came in round 14 of the 2020 Super League season for the Warriors against St Helens where Wigan went on to lose 42–0 against a much more experienced St Helens squad. Kilner started from the bench  and became Wigan Warriors player #1108.

On 28 May 2021 Kilner announced his retirement from rugby league due to injury and also due to a desire to follow a different career.

References

External links
Wigan Warriors profile

1999 births
Living people
Dewsbury Rams players
English rugby league players
Leigh Leopards players
Rochdale Hornets players
Rugby league players from Wakefield
Rugby league props
Wigan Warriors players